The Austrian National League was a former second tier ice hockey league in Austria. For the 2012–13 season, it was replaced by the Inter-National League.

Decline
With the conclusion of the 2011–12 season, seven of the twelve teams left the league. Two teams, Dornbirner and TWK Innsbruck were invited to join the Austrian Hockey League The  farm teams of the Vienna Capitals, EC KAC and the EHC Black Wings Linz all withdrew to join a  junior Austrian Hockey League.  This proved to be the end of the National League. Four of the remaining teams - EK Zell am See, EHC Bregenzerwald, VEU Feldkirch and EHC Lustenau - all subsequently joined the Inter-National League.

Champions

See also
 Austrian Hockey League
 Inter-National League

References

 
Ice hockey leagues in Austria
Aus
Professional ice hockey leagues in Austria